Lambda is the official English student newspaper at Laurentian University in Sudbury, Ontario, Canada. It is directly funded from the student fees paid to the Student General Association (SGA), Laurentian University's full-time student union, although the newspaper's charter explicitly prevents the SGA from exerting editorial control of any kind over it.

Lambda is distributed bi-weekly on Tuesdays and is available around the Laurentian University campus, as well as partner distributors throughout the city.

The Lambda offices currently reside on the third floor of the Parker building.

History
Lambda began publication in 1961 at Laurentian University. The newspaper then consisted of 6 staff members, which included the editor-in-chief, financial director, assistant editor, arts and entertainment editor, sports editor, and science and technology editor.

For the 2010/11 school year, Lambda's masthead and layout were completely redesigned with a fresh, slightly grungy aesthetic.

Operations and distribution
Although Lambda maintains an editorial staff on payroll, it continues to accept unsolicited submissions from students and faculty at Laurentian University, and members of the Greater Sudbury community. Lambda also maintains a policy of publishing all letters to the editor not deemed inappropriate or offensive.

Current staff

Editor in chief: Jessica Robinson

Assistant editor: Gabriel Rodrigues

Staff writers:
Riley Brooks
Daniel Melchior
Taylor Squires
Kaitlynn Zygmont

Photographers:
Zara Ryan

General manager: V.A. Stranges

See also

List of student newspapers in Canada
List of newspapers in Canada

External links

Lambda

Laurentian University
Student newspapers published in Ontario
Newspapers published in Greater Sudbury
Weekly newspapers published in Ontario
Publications established in 1961
1961 establishments in Ontario